The ALGOL Bulletin was a periodical regarding the ALGOL 60 and ALGOL 68 programming languages. It was produced under the auspices of IFIP Working Group 2.1 and published from March 1959 till August 1988.

Time-line of ALGOL Bulletin

References 

ALGOL 60
ALGOL 68
Computer science journals